Diário do Povo (Portuguese for People's Diary) may refer to:

 Diário do Povo (Campinas) in Campinas, Brazil
 Diário do Povo (Pato Branco) in Pato Branco, Brazil
 Diário do Povo (Teresina) in Teresina, Brazil